Chaoyang railway station is a railway station located in the Chaoyang District of Shantou City, Guangdong Province, China, on the Xiamen–Shenzhen railway operated by the Guangzhou Railway Group, China Railway Corporation.

References 

Railway stations in Guangdong